The Glaisnock Viaduct or Caponacre Viaduct is a viaduct over the Glaisnock Water, on the former Glasgow and South Western Railway. It is located in Cumnock, East Ayrshire.

History
The viaduct was opened in 1872 by the Glasgow and South Western Railway. Under the Beeching cuts, the railway was closed in 1964, although the last train had run on 4 June 1962.

It was restored for pedestrian use in 1972, and is now part of a well-used footpath, going between Wyllie Crescent and Birchwood Road. The viaduct was listed as category B listed building in 1977.

Design
It is a masonry viaduct with 13 spans and segmental arches. The viaduct runs in an east-west direction, with a slight curve to the south. The piers, spandrels, and parapets are rubble with red ashlar underneath the arches.

Close to the viaduct is the Murray Park. Cumnock, at the confluence of the Glaisnock Water the Holm Burn. Cumnock has two viaducts, the other being the Woodroad Viaduct.

References

External links

Railway bridges in Scotland
Viaducts in Scotland
Category B listed buildings in East Ayrshire
Listed bridges in Scotland